Vytautas Magnus University (VMU) ( (VDU)) is a public university in Kaunas, Lithuania. The university was founded in 1922 during the interwar period as an alternate national university.

Initially it was known as the University of Lithuania, but in 1930 the university was renamed to Vytautas Magnus University, commemorating the 500th anniversary of the death of the Lithuanian ruler Vytautas the Great, who is known for the nation's greatest historical expansion in the 15th century.

It is one of the leading universities of Lithuania, and has about 8,800 students, including Master's students and Ph.D. candidates. There are a little over 1000 employees, including approximately 90 professors.

History

Establishment of University 
The beginnings of higher education in Lithuania go back to the 16th century when in 1579 the college founded by Jesuits in Vilnius became a higher school of education – Academia et Universitas Vilnensis. In 1832 in the aftermath of the November Uprising, Czar Nicholas I closed the university.

However, in 1918 with the establishment of the independent Republic of Lithuania, the State Council decided to reestablish Vilnius University. Since Vilnius was later under Polish administration and the Lithuanian government had to be transferred to Kaunas, this decision was not put into effect.

At the beginning of 1920, Higher Courses of Study were established in Kaunas, laying the foundation for the establishment of a university. The Lithuanian Cabinet of Ministers decided to establish the University of Lithuania in Kaunas, February 13, 1922.  The ceremonial opening of the university took place February 16, 1922, while on the 12th of April the President of Lithuania confirmed the university's Statute along with six faculties: Theology-Philosophy, Humanities, Law, Mathematics and Sciences, Medicine and Technical Studies.

The affiliate Agricultural Academy was founded in 1924 on the basis of the Agronomy and Forestry sections of the Faculty of Mathematics and Sciences; in 1936 the Veterinary Academy was established in a similar fashion on the basis of the Veterinary section of the Faculty of Medicine.

On June 7, 1930, commemorating the 500th anniversary of the death of Vytautas the Great, the university was renamed in his honor.

Interwar period 

In 1940, Vytautas Magnus University contributed to the reestablishment of Vilnius University. In the winter, the faculties of Humanities and Law were transferred to Vilnius whilst the Faculty of Mathematics and Sciences was moved in the summer. The occupation of Lithuania by the Soviet Union forced the university to be named the University of Kaunas in summer 1940. At the beginning of 1941, university professors took an active role in establishing the Lithuanian Academy of Sciences.

The controversial Lithuanian Provisional Government restored the name of Vytautas Magnus to the university after the Nazi invasion of the Soviet Union in summer 1941. The German occupation government closed the university in March 1943, after some Lithuanians refused to form an SS battalion.

The university was reopened by the Soviet authorities of Lithuania in fall 1944. Four faculties of History-Philology, Medicine, Construction, and Technology were established. The transfer of the Faculty of Philosophy to Vilnius was the reason why the University of Kaunas was closed in fall 1949. The university was restructured into Kaunas Polytechnic Institute and the Kaunas Medical Institute on October 31, 1950.

Re-establishment of University 

The act of re-establishing Vytautas Magnus University was proclaimed April 28, 1989.  The Supreme Soviet of Lithuania passed the law re-establishing the university on July 4, 1989, while the Council of Ministers registered the temporary Statute for the university's period of re-establishment on July 22. The first academic year began in the university's re-established Faculties of Economics, Humanities and Sciences September 1, 1989.

The re-established university was the second in then Soviet-occupied Lithuania, and the first school of higher education that was independent of governmental institutions.  The most important principle in the university's activity became academic freedom, while its main purpose was to prepare graduates with a broad humanistic orientation for Lithuania's needs in research, culture, education and economy.

A common program of study in humanities and general education for the first two years of study for all students appeared in 1990.  Its aim was to develop well-rounded individuals who were free and creative.

In 1991 the university was the first in Lithuania to establish in a system of study based on several levels, the completion of which resulted in the granting of Bachelor's or Master's degrees, as well as Doctoral degrees. The feature of this university still remains exceptional in Lithuania today: this is a liberal policy for studies, according to which students are admitted not into specific specializations but into fields of study.

The students themselves put together their plan of study and make a final choice of their program after the first two years of study.  Particular attention is given to foreign languages and computer skills, making this university different from other schools of higher education in the country.

During the university's first decade the number of students and teachers grew more than twenty times.  It has become the center for academic work in the Humanities and Social Sciences, Theology and Fine Arts, Political Sciences and Law in Kaunas.  Modern programs have been expanding in Informatics, Environmental Sciences, Biology, Mathematics and Physics.

Master's and Doctoral studies became a priority at the university and demanded a pedagogical staff with high qualifications.  Therefore, the university invited to its classrooms and laboratories the most celebrated of scholars from Lithuania's research institutes, creating in 1993 the first Research and Study Association in Lithuania.  Ten Lithuanian research institutes formed this association together with the university: the Institutes for Lithuanian History, Lithuanian Language, Lithuanian Literature and Folklore, Lithuanian Philosophy and Sociology, biochemistry, Mathematics and Informatics, Semiconductor Physics, Psychophysiology and Rehabilitation, Architecture and Civil Engineering, and Lithuanian Forestry.

The university has the right to grant doctoral degrees in nineteen scholarly fields and their branches and the Doctor Habilitus in eight fields. The pedagogical titles of professor and associate professor may be granted in the fields of Humanities, Social Sciences, Physics and Biomedicine.

Structure 
There are 13 academic divisions (of them 10 faculties):

Ranking 

Vytautas Magnus University is currently ranked 801-1000 among World top universities by 2020 QS World University Rankings.

International relations 
The university has ties with numerous universities of North America and Europe, as well as East Asia.

Special student and teacher exchange programs have been set up with the following universities:
In Europe: University of Bergen (Norway), ADA University (Azerbaijan), Roskilde (Denmark), Göteborg, Linköping and Växjö (Sweden), Greifswald, Hohenheim, Zittau/Görlitz (Germany), Poitiers, Du Maine, Pierre et Marie Curie University (France), UBS Vannes (France), Bologna, Parma, SDA Bocconi, University of Cagliari, University of Urbino (Italy), Aveiro (Portugal), University of Torun (Poland) and Tbilisi State University (Georgia);
In the United States: Alabama, Fordham, Creighton, Loyola, Seton Hall universities;
In East Asia: Kansai Gaidai, Akita International University, Waseda and the International Christian University (Japan), Kyung Hee University, Chung-Ang University, and Kangwon National University (South Korea).
A program in Baltic Studies for foreign students was initiated at the university in 1997.

Club activities 
Questions concerning students' academic, social and cultural rights are resolved through the Student Council. About thirty student corporations and clubs are active in the university. The university's artistic groups – the Women's Chamber Choir, the dance group "Žilvitis", the folkloric ensemble "Linago" and the Rhetorical Theatre – have won various contests in Lithuania and abroad.

Notable professors and alumni of Vytautas Magnus University

References

External links 
 Vytautas Magnus University homepage

 
Universities and colleges in Kaunas
History of Kaunas
Buildings and structures in Kaunas
Educational institutions established in 1922
1922 establishments in Lithuania
Law schools in Lithuania